Police Nationale d'Haïti Football Club is a professional football club based in Port-au-Prince, Haiti.

References

Football clubs in Haiti
Sport in Port-au-Prince
Police association football clubs